Edmund Kirwin  (31 March 1876, date of death unknown) was an Australian rules footballer who played with St Kilda in the Victorian Football League (VFL).

Family
The son of Michael Kirwin and Kate Kirwin, née Dunn, Edmund Kirwin was born at Richmond, Victoria on 31 March 1876.

Cricket
He was a well-established batsman, playing for the St Kilda Cricket Club for more than a decade.

Football

St Kilda (VFL)
In June 1898 he was granted a clearance from St Kilda to Albert Park.

Notes

References

External links 
 
 

1876 births
Year of death missing
Australian rules footballers from Victoria (Australia)
St Kilda Football Club players